The 2008 Columbus Crew season was the club's thirteenth season of existence and their thirteenth consecutive season in Major League Soccer, the top flight of American soccer. Columbus also competed in the U.S. Open Cup and the MLS Cup Playoffs. The season covered the period from November 14, 2007 to the start of the 2009 Major League Soccer season.

Background
The Crew's rebuilding under Sigi Schmid paid immense dividends in 2008, as the team won the Supporters Shield and their first MLS Cup championship. Argentine midfielder Guillermo Barros Schelotto won the league MVP award, capping an incredible season with his three-assist performance in the championship game.

Roster

Competitive

MLS

Standings

Eastern Conference

Overall table

Results summary

Results by round

Match results

Postseason

U.S. Open Cup

Statistics

Appearances and goals

Disciplinary record

Clean sheets

See also
 Columbus Crew
 2008 in American soccer
 2008 Major League Soccer season

References

Columbus Crew seasons
Columbus Crew
Columbus Crew
Columbus Crew
MLS Cup champion seasons
2008